Cockles is a 1984 British comedy drama television series which originally aired on BBC One.

Main cast
 James Grout as Arthur Dumpton
 Joan Sims as  Gloria du Bois
 Norman Rodway as  Jacques du Bois 
 Elizabeth Edmonds (actress) as  Emma
 Jane Lowe as Mabel Gutteridge
 Tim Wylton as George
 Fanny Carby as  Madame Rosa
 David Bamber as  Graham
 Katie Verner as  Elsie

Actors who appeared in individual episodes of the series include Trudie Styler, Tessa Peake-Jones, Perry Benson, John Welsh, Roger Brierley, Albert Moses, Clive Merrison, Judy Holt, Bernard Hepton, Gawn Grainger, Bryan Pringle, Ralph Nossek, Brenda Fricker, Julian Curry, Rowena Cooper, Shirin Taylor, William Simons, Constance Chapman, Julia St John and Tony Selby.

References

Bibliography
 Jerry Roberts. Encyclopedia of Television Film Directors. Scarecrow Press, 2009.

External links
 

BBC television dramas
1984 British television series debuts
1984 British television series endings
1980s British drama television series
1980s British television miniseries
English-language television shows